Jeong Jeom-sig (born 15 July 1965) is a South Korean politician who was a prosecutor and lawyer.

Life 
Jeong was born in Goseong County, South Gyeongsang Province. He passed the 30th judicial examination in 1986. He later served as a high-level prosecutor at the prosecution office before retiring in June 2017. He later opened as a lawyer.

In 2019, he ran in the Tongyeong-Goseong by-election with the Liberty Korea Party's nomination.

References

External links 
 
 Jeong Jeom-sig's blog

1965 births
Living people
People from South Gyeongsang Province
Members of the National Assembly (South Korea)
Liberty Korea Party politicians
South Korean prosecutors